Drosera stricticaulis, the erect sundew, is an erect perennial tuberous species in the carnivorous plant genus Drosera. It is endemic to Western Australia and is found near watercourses and granite outcrops in sandy clay or loam. Pink flowers bloom from July to October.

Drosera stricticaulis was first described by Ludwig Diels in 1906 as a variety of D. macrantha. In 1913, Oswald Hewlett Sargent elevated the variety to species rank. A recently described infraspecific taxon under D. macrantha, D. macrantha subsp. eremaea, was described in 1992 by N. G. Marchant and Allen Lowrie but reclassified as a subspecies of D. stricticaulis in 1996 when Jan Schlauer provided a comprehensive revision and new field key to the genus. Other authorities, such as Western Australia's Department of Environment and Conservation's FloraBase still recognize subspecies eremaea under D. macrantha.

See also
List of Drosera species

References

External links

Carnivorous plants of Australia
Caryophyllales of Australia
Eudicots of Western Australia
Plants described in 1906
stricticaulis